Parliamentary elections were held in Transkei on 24 September 1981. The Transkei National Independence Party  won 74 of the 75 elected seats.

Results

Aftermath
By-elections were held to fill the two vacant seats, both won by the Transkei National Independence Party.

References

Transkei
Elections in Transkei
September 1981 events in Africa